UFC Fight Night: McGregor vs. Brandão (also known as UFC Fight Night 46) was a mixed martial arts event held on July 19, 2014, at The O2 in Dublin, Ireland.

Background
This was the second time that the organization has hosted an event in Dublin, following UFC 93 in 2009.

The event was expected to be headlined by a featherweight bout between Conor McGregor and Cole Miller. However, Miller was forced to pull out due to an injury, and was replaced by Diego Brandão.  Despite the change with one of the headlining participants, ticket demand was high for the event, with nearly all tickets selling out within a few hours of going on sale.

Ryan LaFlare was scheduled to face Gunnar Nelson at the event.  However, LaFlare was removed from the card and was replaced by Zak Cummings.

Tom Lawlor was expected to face Ilir Latifi at the event, but Lawlor pulled out of the bout with an injury and was replaced by promotional newcomer Chris Dempsey.

Results

Bonus awards
The following fighters were awarded $50,000 bonuses:
 Fight of the Night: Cathal Pendred vs. Mike King ^
 Performance of the Night: Conor McGregor and Gunnar Nelson
^ Bonus winner Mike King had his award rescinded after testing positive for anabolic steroids during his post fight drug screening.

See also
List of UFC events
2014 in UFC

References

2014 in Irish sport
2014 in mixed martial arts
Mixed martial arts in Ireland
Sports competitions in Dublin (city)
UFC Fight Night
2010s in Dublin (city)
July 2014 sports events in Europe